Saifu (c. 577) was a king of Axum.

He is known from a chance mention in a Chinese biography of Muhammad, the T'ien-fang Chih-sheng shih-lu, written between 1721 and 1724 by Liu Chih. This work uses older materials that have been traced to a biography of the Prophet written by Sa'id al-Din Mohammed bin Mas'ud bin Mohammad al-Kazarumi, who died in 1357. According to this Chinese biography, the najashi of Ethiopia was said to have sent an ambassador with gifts to Mohammed's family upon sighting a star that announced his birth. When Mohammed became seven years old, Saifu, described as the najashi's grandson, likewise sent gifts. This source also adds that Saifu was the grandfather of the najashi who gave shelter to the Muslim immigrants around 615-6 at Axum. This began the spread of Islam into Ethiopia.

In reporting the contents of this "very tentative" source, Munro-Hay speculates how this genealogical relationship around Saifu might fit the known series of rulers in the later 6th century (identifying Saifu's grandfather with Kaleb, and his grandson with Sahama), and appears to admit that these details are plausible.

Notes 

Kings of Axum
6th-century monarchs in Africa